Alexis Díaz may refer to:

 Alexis Díaz (boxer) (born 1987), Venezuelan minimumweight boxer
 Alex Diaz (outfielder) (born 1968), American former baseball player
 Alexis Díaz (baseball) (born 1996), Puerto Rican professional baseball pitcher

See also 
 Alex Díaz (footballer) (born 1989), Colombian football defender
 Alex Díaz de la Portilla (born 1964), Cuban-American politician
 Alexis Díaz de Villegas, actor in Juan of the Dead
 Alexis Dias, Portuguese guitarist from the band Fingertips